Thomas James Tyquin (18 June 1932 – 15 July 2015) was an Australian rugby league player. He was a member of the Australian squad which won the inaugural Rugby League World Cup in 1957.

Club football
Tyquin was a lock forward who alongside his brother, Bill, played his club football with Souths (Brisbane).

National representative career
Tom Tyquin made six Test appearances for Australia after debuting in the 1956 domestic series against New Zealand. He toured with the 1956–57 Kangaroos playing in two Tests and thirteen tour matches. He was selected in the 1957 Australian World Cup squad. A number of his representative appearances were played as a second-row forward.

References

External links
Profile at Rugby League Project

1932 births
2015 deaths
Australia national rugby league team players
Australian rugby league players
Queensland rugby league team players
Rugby league players from Brisbane
Rugby league second-rows
Souths Logan Magpies players